Didier Brunner (born 6 March 1948, in Neuilly-sur-Seine) is a French film producer.

Brunner originally began working in the film industry as an assistant director and later director on educational documentary films. He later moved into working in the field of animation.

In 1987, Brunner founded Trans-Europe Film, in which he produced animated productions such as Michel Ocelot's Tales of the Night.

In 1994, he left Trans-Europe Film and started Les Armateurs where he has produced animations such as The Old Lady and the Pigeons and The Triplets of Belleville by Sylvain Chomet, and Kirikou and the Sorceress and other films by Michel Ocelot.

Filmography as producer
1992: Tales of the Night (TV movie)
1996: Carland Cross (TV series)
1998: Lupo Alberto (TV series)
1998: The Old Lady and the Pigeons (short film)
1998: Kirikou and the Sorceress
1999: Charley and Mimmo (TV series)
2000: Princes and Princesses
2001: Belphegor (TV series)
2001: The Boy Who Wanted to Be a Bear
2003: The Triplets of Belleville
2005: Kiri le clown (TV series)
2005: Kirikou and the Wild Beasts
2006: L'Equilibre de la terreur
2009: The Secret of Kells
2010: Kill Me Please (live-action film)
2012: Ernest & Celestine
2012: Kirikou and the Men and Women 
2015: The Long Long Holiday
2021: The Summit of the Gods

External links

1948 births
Living people
French animated film producers
French film producers
People from Neuilly-sur-Seine